Sybaris testaceus, is a species of blister beetle found in India and Sri Lanka.

Description
Body length is about 8.7 to 16.6 mm. Head with moderately coarse deep and dense punctures. Eyes are small. Pronotum with moderately coarse, deep and dense punctures. Elytra brownish with a black band found at the apex. Legs are black. Ventrum black and covered with short pubescence. Male has deeply emarginate sixth visible abdominal sternum, in which female is feebly emarginate.

References 

Meloidae
Insects of Sri Lanka
Insects of India
Insects described in 1792